Nedstryn is a small village in Stryn Municipality in Vestland county, Norway. The small village is home to Nedstryn Church. The church serves all of the residents in the area surrounding the church, including the nearby village of Stryn and the areas north of the lake Oppstrynsvatnet including the village of Flo.

References

Villages in Vestland
Stryn